ACSC may refer to:

 Advanced Casino Systems Corporation, a product group of Bally Technologies
 Air Command and Staff College, Montgomery, Alabama
 Alternating Closed and Semi-Closed rebreather, a special type rebreather for diving 
 Ambulatory care sensitive conditions, a category of illnesses or health conditions
 Anderson Community School Corporation, Anderson, Indiana
 Asheville City SC, a National Premier Soccer League club based in Asheville, North Carolina
 Australian Command and Staff College, Weston Creek, Canberra
 Australian Cyber Security Centre
 Automobile Club of Southern California